The white-banded tyrannulet (Mecocerculus stictopterus) is a species of bird in the family Tyrannidae.

It is found in Bolivia, Colombia, Ecuador, Peru, and Venezuela. Its natural habitat is subtropical or tropical moist montane forests.

References

white-banded tyrannulet
Birds of the Northern Andes
white-banded tyrannulet
white-banded tyrannulet
Taxonomy articles created by Polbot